Geoff Thatcher (born 22 September 1950) is  a former Australian rules footballer who played with Footscray in the Victorian Football League (VFL).

Notes

External links 
		

Living people
1950 births
Australian rules footballers from Victoria (Australia)
Western Bulldogs players
Maryborough Football Club players